Kafr Nabudah (also spelled Kafar Nabuda) is a town in northern Syria, administratively part of the Hama Governorate, located northwest of Hama. Nearby localities include Qalaat al-Madiq and Jamasat Udayat to the west, al-Suqaylabiyah to the southwest, al-Mughayr and Karnaz to the south, Kafr Zita to the southeast and al-Habit to the east. According to the Syria Central Bureau of Statistics (CBS), Kafr Nabudah had a population of 13,513 in the 2004 census, making it the largest locality in the Qalaat al-Madiq nahiyah ("subdistrict.")

History
In 2011, a mosaic was discovered in Kafr Nabudah dates back to the 6th century during the Byzantine era.

In  1838, its  inhabitants were noted as being predominantly Sunni Muslims.

During the Syrian Civil War, the Syrian army re-controlled the town during the Northwestern Syria offensive in 2019.

References

Bibliography

 

Populated places in al-Suqaylabiyah District